The 2019 European Rally Championship was the 67th season of the FIA European Rally Championship, the European continental championship series in rallying. The season was also the seventh following the merge between the European Rally Championship and the Intercontinental Rally Challenge. Alexey Lukyanuk was the reigning champion and he returned to defend the title switching from a Ford Fiesta R5 to the Citroën C3 R5. On the final round at Rally Hungary, Chris Ingram became the first British driver in 52 years to win the title in a Skoda Fabia R5.

In 2019 the two European Junior Championship tiers were renamed: ERC Junior U28 became ERC1 Junior and ERC Junior U27  is retitled ERC3 Junior.

ERC Classes
FIA ERC1: Main class, for FIA-homologated cars with R5 regulations. Best 6 scores from 8 events.

FIA ERC2: Second tier, for cars more standard, albeit with turbocharged engines and four-wheel drive. This class allows the N4, the R4-K and RGT rules. Best 4 scores from 8 events.

FIA ERC3: Third ERC tier, the first for front-wheel-drive cars. Allows R3 and R2 cars. Best 6 scores from 8 events.

FIA ERC1 Junior: For drivers aged 28 and under on 1 January 2019 in R5 cars. The champion receives a prize money to contest the two last rounds of ERC (not part of ERC1 Junior). Best 4 scores from 6 events.

 FIA ERC3 Junior: For drivers aged 27 and under on 1 January 2019 in R2 cars on Pirelli control tyres. The winner will get the chance to drive in two rounds of the 2020 FIA ERC in Škoda Fabia R5.  Best 4 scores from 6 events.

ERC Ladies Trophy: for female drivers including all classes (ERC1, ERC2 and ERC3) eligible. Drivers count their best four scores.

Abarth Rally Cup: competition with six rounds of the ERC with the rear-wheel-drive Abarth 124 rally.

FIA European Rally Championship for Teams: each team can nominate a maximum of three cars (from all categories), counting the two highest-placed cars from each team. Counting 6 best scores from 8 events.

ERC Nations Cup: like the ERC for Teams but for teams supported by a national motorsport federation or automobile association.

Calendar

The calendar for the 2019 season features eight rallies (four rallies on tarmac and four on gravel) like the previous season, albeit in a shaked-up order. The Acropolis Rally was discontinued in its entirety after 2018, and was replaced by a new event in Hungary, Nyíregyháza Rally, which will also be the season finale. The previous season finale, Rally Liepāja, was moved to the third round of the season in May. The Cyprus Rally and Rally Poland were switched to the seventh and fourth rounds, respectively.

Teams and drivers

ERC

ERC-2

ERC-3

Ladies Trophy

Results

Championship standings

Points Systems

 For both the Drivers' championships of the ERC, ERC-3, Teams' championship and Nations Cup only the best six results will be retained by each driver/team.
 For the ERC-2, ERC1 Junior, the ERC3 Junior the Ladies Trophy, only the best four results will be retained by each driver.
 Points for final position are awarded as in following table:

 Bonus points awarded for position in each Leg

Drivers' Championships

ERC

ERC-2

ERC-3

Ladies Trophy

ERC 1 Junior

ERC 3 Junior

Abarth Rally Cup

Teams' Championship

Nations Cup

References

External links

 

2019 in rallying
Rally
2019